The Sanremo Music Festival 1977 was the 27th annual Sanremo Music Festival, held at the Teatro Ariston in Sanremo, province of Imperia between 3 and 5 March 1977. The final night was broadcast by Rai 1. The first two nights were broadcast live by radio and  presented by Maria Giovanna Elmi, while the final night Elmi hosted together with Mike Bongiorno.
 
Rules of this edition consisted a "head to head" mechanism between two singers at a time. A jury, composed of 25 members, was located immediately under the stage and had to express the vote for a singer or another.

Winners of the Festival were the musical group Homo Sapiens with the song "Bella da morire".

Participants and results

References

1977 in Italian music
1977 music festivals
Sanremo Music Festival by year